Praia das Gatas (Portuguese meaning "beach of the cats") is a sandy beach in the northeastern part of the island of Boa Vista in Cape Verde. The nearest village is Fundo das Figueiras, 5 km to the southwest. It forms a part of Northern Nature Park (Parque Natural do Norte). The small island Ilhéu dos Pássaros lies off the coast at the Praia das Gatas.

References

Beaches of Cape Verde
Geography of Boa Vista, Cape Verde